Michael Jefferson King (born 1 July 1961), is a British former bodybuilder and wrestler, best known for playing Shadow in the ITV show Gladiators.

Biography
He was born in London to Jamaican parents. King moved to New York City as a 14-year-old where he excelled at sports, was on the school American Football team  and started weight training to develop his physique. He fell victim to the crack boom of the late 70s and became a drug addict. His mother requested help from his father back in England who sent money to pay for his fare to England to escape drugs. King spent the money his father sent twice on drugs before the third time he bought a ticket and relocated to England, at a time when the drug was becoming available and he started using again.  He eventually overcame his habit, married, had two children, Theo and Tiffany and concentrated on bodybuilding.

King was preparing to enter into the world of professional bodybuilding, when he received a phone call from the producers of ITV's Gladiators in Birmingham offering him a place on the show. Shadow was known for his stare and his record in the 'Duel' event. One of the more intimidating members of the Gladiators team, he once hit his opponent so hard in the Joust event that the ends of the pugil stick were clearly damaged.

In early 1995, King was at the centre of a steroid abuse scandal that saw him lose his job on the show. He was outed by the press after taking drugs in a London nightclub in King's Road.  After losing his job, his home in Kidderminster, and his wife and children, who moved to Essex, King relocated to London where he set up a business, become a wrestler and had a cameo role in the Spice Girls movie Spiceworld in 1997. His fall from grace saw him turn to drugs, smoking heroin, crack cocaine, and he struggled to deal with his addiction for nearly 20 years, turning to crime to pay for his habit which saw him in and out of jail.

In March 2005, whilst travelling on the top deck of a 205 bus in Southall, London, King was discovered in possession of an elderly person's bus pass, which he had shown to the driver to board the bus, despite being only 43 at the time.  He was arrested for being in possession of stolen property, and taken to Southall Police Station.

In an April 2011 interview he reported that he had finally beaten his addiction and was working at a drug rehabilitation clinic to help people suffering from drug problems and that he had restored contacts with his ex-wife and children and his mother whom he had avoided for many years because "he didn't want her seeing him like that".

In 2021 King was part of a criminal gang whose members were charged with a range of offences in connection with the kidnapping, beating, and false imprisonment of Aaron Ali in Acton, west London, in March 2020 and a subsequent blackmail attempt on members of Ali's family. At Isleworth Crown Court, King and one other man both pleaded guilty to charges of blackmail and were remanded in custody awaiting sentencing. Four other defendants in the case denied the charges against them. He was jailed for six years and three months.

References

1961 births
Sportspeople from London
Gladiators (1992 British TV series)
English sportspeople of Jamaican descent
Black British sportspeople
English bodybuilders
Living people